Patrick or Paddy Roberts may refer to:

Patrick Roberts (born 1997), English footballer
Paddy Roberts (footballer) (1939-2022), Irish footballer
Paddy Roberts (politician) (born 1947), chairman of the Progressive Nationalist Party of British Columbia
Paddy Roberts (songwriter) (1910–1975), songwriter and singer
Pat Roberts (born 1936), United States Senator from Kansas

See also